Pedro Guilherme Abreu dos Santos (born 20 June 1997), better known as Pedro, is a Brazilian professional footballer who plays as a striker for Campeonato Brasileiro Série A club Flamengo and the Brazil national team.

He began his career with Fluminense, playing 93 total games and scoring 31 goals. In 2019, he signed for Fiorentina for €11 million, but after playing rarely in Serie A he returned to Brazil with Flamengo, initially on loan before a permanent transfer. He has won several honours with Flamengo, including the Campeonato Brasileiro Série A, Copa do Brasil, Copa Libertadores and two Campeonato Carioca titles.

Club career

Fluminense
Born in Rio de Janeiro, Pedro began his career at the age of eight in the youth ranks of Flamengo, who released him at the age of 14. He spent two years at Duquecaxiense and had a brief spell at Artsul before moving to Flamengo's rivals Fluminense.

He made his professional debut on 10 March 2016 in a 2–0 win over Criciúma in the Primeira Liga, starting the match in what was his only appearance as Fluminense won the tournament. On 26 June that year he played his first game in the Campeonato Brasileiro Série A, replacing Richarlison for the final seven minutes of a 2–1 win over rivals Flamengo, and made two more substitute appearances over the season.

On 24 January 2017, substitute Pedro scored his first professional goal in a 3–2 win over Criciúma in the Primeira Liga opener, and he added two more in ten games as they came runners-up to Flamengo in the Campeonato Carioca. On 21 September, he scored the crucial away goal in a 2–1 loss away to LDU Quito in the second leg of the round of 16 in the Copa Sudamericana, sending Flu through.

Pedro became a regular in the 2018 Campeonato Carioca season, top scoring with seven goals in 13 games, earning him a place in the Team of the Tournament. On 25 March, he opened a 3–0 win over Botafogo at the Maracanã Stadium to win the Taça Rio.

In the summer of 2018, Pedro attracted offers from other clubs, with Fluminense rejecting an €8.5 million offer from Bordeaux and a €15 million bid by Mexico's Monterrey. Despite a knee injury, he was Fluminense's top scorer of the league season with 10 goals in 19 games, and 19 in 40 games over the whole year; he was named Best Newcomer at the Prêmio Craque do Brasileirão.

Fiorentina
On 2 September 2019, Pedro joined Italian club Fiorentina on a five-year contract. The transfer fee was €11 million, of which €8 million went to Fluminense for 30% out of their 50% share in his economic rights, and the other €3 million was paid to Artsul, a third-party owner who owned the other 50%.

Pedro made his debut in Serie A on 3 November in a 1–1 home draw with Parma, replacing Kevin-Prince Boateng for the final five minutes. He played only 59 minutes in Italy.

Loan to Flamengo
On 23 January 2020, Pedro returned to Rio de Janeiro, joining Flamengo on loan for the rest of the year, for a fee of €1 million with the option to purchase. He made his debut on 4 February in the Campeonato Carioca, replacing Giorgian de Arrascaeta in the 65th minute away to Resende and scoring the equaliser in a 3–1 win eight minutes later. He helped his side to a 3–1 aggregate final win over Fluminense in July, scoring the opening goal.

In the 2020 Campeonato Brasileiro Série A, Pedro scored his first goals on 2 September 2020 with two in a 5–3 win at Bahia. With 13 goals, he was 7th top scorer in the league, which his team won. He was unused as the team won the Supercopa do Brasil against Athletico Paranaense, but scored from the bench in a 5–2 aggregate win over Independiente del Valle in the Recopa Sudamericana.

Flamengo
On 9 December 2020, Pedro signed a contract with Flamengo lasting until 2025, for a fee of €15 million. The fee was paid in instalments, with Fluminense and Artsul also receiving. Towards the end of the 2021 Campeonato Carioca, he scored all of the goals in a 3–0 win at Volta Redonda on 1 May.

On 25 January 2023, Pedro extended his contract with Flamengo until 31 December 2027.

International career
Pedro was called up by coach Tite for the Brazil national team in August 2018, for friendlies against the United States and El Salvador. However, he withdrew through injury and was replaced by his former clubmate Richarlison. On 13 November 2020, he made his debut in a 2022 FIFA World Cup qualifier against Venezuela, which Brazil won 1–0.

On 17 June 2021, Pedro was named in the Brazil squad for the 2020 Summer Olympics. However, he withdrew from the squad on 2 July after Flamengo declined to release him for the tournament, and was replaced again by Richarlison.

Pedro scored his first senior international goal on 27 September 2022, in a 5–1 win over Tunisia. On 7 November, he was named in the squad for the 2022 FIFA World Cup.

Career statistics

Club

International

Scores and results list Brazil's goal tally first, score column indicates score after each Pedro goal.

Honours

Fluminense
Primeira Liga: 2016

Flamengo
Copa Libertadores: 2022
Recopa Sudamericana: 2020
Campeonato Brasileiro Série A: 2020
 Copa do Brasil: 2022
Supercopa do Brasil: 2020, 2021
Campeonato Carioca: 2020, 2021

Brazil Youth
Toulon Tournament: 2019

Individual
Campeonato Carioca top scorer: 2018
Campeonato Carioca Team of the Year: 2018
Campeonato Brasileiro Série A Best Newcomer: 2018
 Copa Libertadores Top scorer: 2022
 Copa Libertadores Best of the Tournament: 2022
 Copa Libertadores Team of the Tournament: 2022
South American Team of the Year: 2022
South American Footballer of the Year: 2022

References

External links 

 

1997 births
Living people
Brazilian footballers
Association football forwards
Fluminense FC players
ACF Fiorentina players
CR Flamengo footballers
Campeonato Brasileiro Série A players
Serie A players
Copa Libertadores-winning players
Footballers from Rio de Janeiro (city)
Brazil international footballers
Brazil youth international footballers
Brazilian expatriate footballers
Brazilian expatriate sportspeople in Italy
Expatriate footballers in Italy
2022 FIFA World Cup players